Zoo is a 2007 American documentary film based on the life and death of Kenneth Pinyan, an American man who died of peritonitis due to perforation of the colon after engaging in receptive anal sex with a horse. The film combines audio testimony from people involved in the case or who were familiar with Pinyan, "with speculative re-enactments that feature a mix of actors and actual subjects." 

The film’s title refers to the subcultural term for a zoophile, a person with a sexual interest in animals. Zoo’s filmmakers intended to approach the film’s subject matter from a non-sensationalized perspective and chose to forego more lurid details, focusing instead on humanizing the people involved.

The film premiered at the Sundance Film Festival in January 2007, where it was one of 16 documentaries accepted out of 857 candidates. Following Sundance, it was selected as one of five American films to be presented at the Directors' Fortnight sidebar at the 2007 Cannes Film Festival.

Synopsis 
In July of 2005 in the small rural town of Enumclaw, Washington, Kenneth Pinyan died from internal injuries sustained while attempting a sexual act with a horse. The police investigation of the incident led to the discovery of a network of zoophiles who held communal gatherings at a local farm for the purpose of having sex with horses. At the farm, the police seized videotapes and DVDs that showed several men engaging in sexual acts with the resident Arabian stallions. At the time, Washington state had no laws concerning bestiality; in response to the case, the State Senate swiftly voted to criminalize bestiality in 2006. Animal cruelty charges were not filed against the participants because no evidence of injury to the horses was found. The videographer in the Pinyan incident, James Michael Tait, was charged with criminal trespassing. 

Two Seattle-based filmmakers, Robinson Devor and Charles Mudede, curious about the type of people involved in the underground world of zoophilia, interviewed figures close to the case, including other members of the zoophile ring. The three zoophiles interviewed by the filmmakers are identified by their names in the online zoo community—Coyote, H and the Happy Horseman. H was the man who organized the zoo gatherings. Only one zoo, Coyote, agreed to appear in the film’s re-enactments.

Other interview subjects include Jenny Edwards, the founder of a local animal rescue organization who helped investigate potential animal abuse in the case, as well as legislators and local law enforcement officers.

Production 
On their reasoning for wanting to make a documentary about the Enumclaw case, Robinson Devor and Charles Mudede said when the news story first broke in 2005, it quickly became a punch line in the media. Said Mudede, "There seemed to be two responses: repulsion or laughter. People didn’t want to have any connection or identification with these men. Early on Rob and I said to each other, 'We’re going to revive their humanity.'"

Mudede noted, "It was only after Pinyan died, when law enforcement looked for one way to punish his associates, that the legality of bestiality in Washington State became an issue [...] The prosecutor's office wanted to charge Tait with animal abuse, but the police found no evidence of abused animals on the many videotapes they collected from his home…the prosecutors could only charge Tait with trespassing." 

Mudede, a journalist at The Stranger, had written an article about the incident and was contacted by one of the participants in the case. Of the participants, called "zoos", Mudede said "there was a desperate need to talk" and to tell their side of the story. Coyote, the only zoo who appears in the film, said he came to trust Devor to tell their story, saying "I felt in my gut he was not going to make an exploitive type of movie." When Zoo’s selection for the 2007 Sundance Film Festival was announced in December 2006, H, the farmhand who was the host of the men’s get-togethers, contacted Devor and consented to an audio interview, which Devor edited into the film. 

Devor said the film’s biggest challenge was finding locations to shoot, as horse farms in the Seattle area did not want to be associated with the documentary. Said Devor, "Owners would say things like: 'We have Microsoft picnics here. They’re going to think it happened in my barn.'" The production ended up filming in Canada.

The film was originally titled In the Forest There Is Every Kind of Bird, but this was changed to Zoo in a reference to zoophilia.

Reception
Sundance judges called the film a "humanizing look at the life and bizarre death of a seemingly normal Seattle family man who met his untimely end after an unusual encounter with a horse". The film was picked up for distribution by THINKFilm, whose executive said, "The film is extreme more in its formalism than in terms of graphic content."

The Seattle Times called the film "A tough sell that gets respect at Sundance", also noting the local economic effect of landmark films which put a location "on the map". Rob Nelson of the OC Weekly said, "Zoo achieves the seemingly impossible: It tells the luridly reported tale of a Pacific Northwest Boeing engineer's fatal sexual encounter with a horse in a way that's haunting rather than shocking and tender beyond reason." Dennis Lim of The New York Times commended how the film is able to tell its story "with neither squeamishness nor prurience." Similar views were expressed by Kenneth Turan of the Los Angeles Times, who called it a "remarkably, an elegant, eerily lyrical film", and Geoff Pevere of the Toronto Star, who said the film is "gorgeously artful ... one of the most beautifully restrained, formally distinctive and mysterious films of the entire festival". Anthony Kaufman of IndieWire called it "one of the most beautiful films of the year" and noted that "without sensation", it steps back to a "non-traditional" viewpoint, with "Devor [making] a persuasive, provocative and deeply profound case for tolerance and understanding in the face of the seemingly most incomprehensible of acts".

Other reviewers criticized the film for breaching "the last taboo", or for sinking to new depths, with Kathleen Parker of The Baltimore Sun writing, "More compelling than the depths of man's degeneracy is our cultural rationalization of 'art,' whereby pushing the envelope is confused with genius and scuttling the last taboo is seen as an expression of sophistication."

On the review aggregator website Rotten Tomatoes, the film has an approval rating of 60%, based on 50 reviews. The website's consensus reads, "While a marginally fascinating look at a taboo subject, Zoo is bogged down by its overly artistic presentation."

Awards and recognition
Zoo was one of 16 documentaries selected, out of 856 submitted, for screening at the Sundance Film Festival, and played at numerous U.S. regional festivals thereafter.

It was selected as one of the top five American films to be presented at the Directors' Fortnight sidebar at the 2007 Cannes Film Festival.

Aftermath 
Charles Mudede reported in 2015 that the zoophiles featured in the film had remained in contact with the director; according to Mudede, they believed that Devor was "a real ally" to their cause.

References

External links
 
 

American documentary films
Documentary films about sexuality
Zoophilia in culture
2007 films
2007 documentary films
2007 independent films
Films set in Washington (state)
Films shot in Washington (state)
2000s English-language films
2000s American films
English-language documentary films